Ivan Petrović (born 17 July 1986) is a Serbian football midfielder who plays for and captains FK Jedinstvo Užice.

Career
Born in Užice, he made his first football steps in the local club FK Sloboda Užice. In 2003, he transferred from the youth team to the first team of Sloboda. He played for Sloboda until 2009, when he transferred to FK Budućnost Podgorica. Until that transfer, Petrović recorded 108 matches and scored 19 goals for Sloboda. After a short time spent in Montenegro, he returned to Sloboda. This time he spent 2 years at his home club and played a total of 25 matches and scored 11 goals. The following season, he moved to FK Metalac Gornji Milanovac, and after that he moved to CSMS Iași. After returning to Serbia in 2013, he played for FK Sopot for 2 years, for the first time for Jedinstvo Užice, for the third time for Sloboda and then moved to FK Sevojno. In 2017, he returned to Jedinstvo for the second time, but the following season he moved to FK Drina Ljubovija. Shortly afterwards, in 2019, Petrović returned for the fourth time to the reconstructed team of Sloboda, which then competed in the Serbian First League. A couple of months later, he comes to the Jedinstvo team for the third time. Last season, Petrović was the second best scorer of Jedinstvo in the half-season, with one goal behind the best scorer of the team. However, the season was interrupted due to the corona virus. In the middle of the 2020–21 season, Petrović is the team's top scorer with 9 goals scored.

References

External links
 
 Ivan Petrović stats at utakmica.rs 
 

1986 births
Living people
Sportspeople from Užice
Association football midfielders
Serbian footballers
FK Sloboda Užice players
FK Metalac Gornji Milanovac players
FK Jedinstvo Užice players
Serbian SuperLiga players
FK Budućnost Podgorica players
Montenegrin First League players
Serbian expatriate footballers
Serbian expatriate sportspeople in Romania
Expatriate footballers in Romania
FC Politehnica Iași (2010) players